The Methodist Episcopal Church of Montrose, also known as the United Methodist Church of Montrose, is a historic church in Montrose, Colorado, United States.  It was designed circa 1909 as an Akron Plan church by Thomas P. Barber, but it was not completed until 1920.  A 1991 addition was designed by Parik Davis.

References

Churches on the National Register of Historic Places in Colorado
Churches completed in 1920
20th-century Methodist church buildings in the United States
Montrose, Colorado
United Methodist churches in Colorado
Buildings and structures in Montrose County, Colorado
Akron Plan church buildings
National Register of Historic Places in Montrose County, Colorado